Sakurako (written 桜子 or 櫻子) is a feminine Japanese given name. Notable people with the name include:

, Japanese manga artist
Sakurako Kaoru (薫 桜子, born 1982), Japanese gravure model and AV idol
, Japanese writer
 (born 1996), Japanese actress and singer
 (born 1998), Japanese actress
 (born 1984), Japanese curler

Fictional characters
, a character in the light novel Beautiful Bones: Sakurako's Investigation
, a character in the visual novel Flyable Heart
, a character in the manga series YuruYuri
, a character in the television series Kamen Rider Kuuga
, a character in the manga series Mahō Sensei Negima!
, a character in the manga series Detective School Q

Japanese feminine given names